The Rabat American School is an independent preparatory day school located in Rabat, Morocco. The program is co-educational and non-residential. English is the language of instruction.

Campus
On January 8, 2019, the school moved to a new campus in Hay el Fath, next to the ocean. It has a 24 acre size and facilities include(d) four computer labs, six science labs, two libraries, an auditorium, a sports field, a gymnasium and two swimming pools. The school is still expanding today.

Curriculum
Rabat American School offers the International Baccalaureate Diploma Programme at the high school level and the high school diploma.

See also
 :Category:Alumni of Rabat American School

References

External links
Rabat American School
Rabat American School Alumni LinkedIn Group
Rabat American School on Google Maps (Ecole Americaine de Rabat)

Educational institutions established in 1962
International Baccalaureate schools
International schools in Rabat
American international schools in Morocco